Charlie Burton may refer to:

Charlie Burton (explorer), British explorer
Charlie Burton, character in List of Person of Interest episodes

See also
Charles Burton (disambiguation)